The 1994 Eisenhower Trophy took place 6 to 9 October on the Albatros course at Le Golf National and on La Vallée course at La Boulie near Versailles, France. It was the 19th World Amateur Team Championship for the Eisenhower Trophy. The tournament was a 72-hole stroke play team event with 45 four-man teams. The best three scores for each round counted towards the team total. Initially each team played one round on each of the two courses. The leading 24 teams then played two further rounds at Le Golf National while the remaining teams played two rounds at La Boulie.

The United States won the Eisenhower Trophy for the first time since 1982, finishing 11 strokes ahead of the silver medalists, Great Britain and Ireland. Sweden took the bronze medal with Australia in fourth place. Allen Doyle had the lowest individual score, 10-under-par 277, four strokes better than Warren Bennett.

The 1994 Espirito Santo Trophy was played at Le Golf National one week prior.

Teams
44 four-man teams contested the event.

The following table lists the players on the leading teams.

Scores

Source:

The leading 24 teams played the third and fourth rounds at Le Golf National while the remaining teams played at La Boulie.

Individual leaders
There was no official recognition for the lowest individual scores.

Source:

Players in the leading teams played three rounds at Le Golf National and one at La Boulie.

References

External links
Record Book on International Golf Federation website 

Eisenhower Trophy
Golf tournaments in France
Eisenhower Trophy
Eisenhower Trophy
Eisenhower Trophy